In the mathematical study of several complex variables, the Szegő kernel is an integral kernel that gives rise to a reproducing kernel on a natural Hilbert space of holomorphic functions.  It is named for its discoverer, the Hungarian mathematician Gábor Szegő.

Define the Hardy space H2(∂Ω) to be the closure in L2(∂Ω) of the restrictions of elements of A(Ω) to the boundary. The Poisson integral implies that each element ƒ of H2(∂Ω) extends to a holomorphic function Pƒ in Ω. Furthermore, for each z ∈ Ω, the map

defines a continuous linear functional on H2(∂Ω).  By the Riesz representation theorem, this linear functional is represented by a kernel kz, which is to say

The Szegő kernel is defined by

Like its close cousin, the Bergman kernel, the Szegő kernel is holomorphic in z.  In fact, if φi is an orthonormal basis of H2(∂Ω) consisting entirely of the restrictions of functions in A(Ω), then a Riesz–Fischer theorem argument shows that

References
 

Complex analysis
Several complex variables